Genesee Hospital was a hospital in Rochester, New York, United States, that was open from September 19, 1889, to May 21, 2001.

Closure
In April 2001, Via Health, the company that owned the hospital, announced that the hospital would close within 90 days in an effort to cut costs.  The move was met with criticism from community members and workers at the hospital.

The hospital site and buildings remained intact after the hospital's closure, and ViaHealth retained a presence, with a diabetes center and some other facilities.  In April 2006, Buckingham Properties purchased the site, and in February 2007, announced that the property would be transformed into a mixed-use site, with apartments, offices and retail space.

References

Hospital buildings completed in 1889
Hospitals in Rochester, New York
Hospitals established in 1889
Defunct hospitals in New York (state)
1889 establishments in New York (state)